Dimitrios Drivas was a Greek swimmer best known for competing at the 1896 Summer Olympics in Athens. He was born in Spetses.

Drivas competed in the 100 metres freestyle for sailors event, which was for the Greek Navy only, eleven sailors entered but only three started, Drivas came last out of the three and still won a bronze medal.

References

External links

Year of birth missing
Year of death missing
Greek male swimmers
Swimmers at the 1896 Summer Olympics
19th-century sportsmen
Olympic swimmers of Greece
Olympic bronze medalists for Greece
Olympic bronze medalists in swimming
Hellenic Navy personnel
People from Spetses
Medalists at the 1896 Summer Olympics
Sportspeople from Attica
Place of death missing